Shanawan is one of the biggest villages in Monufia Governorate, Egypt. It is in the middle between Shibin El Kom City and Al-Baghor City. Shanawan is famous for vegetable products. It is marked by the taro (AlQulqas).

The biggest families in Shanawan are Sherif, Eissa, El-Gazzar, Al-Naggar, Elnemr, Al-Bambi, Al-Khaiyat, Abou Hashhash, Abdou, Zaied, Abd El Bary and Abou-Elsoud.

References

Populated places in Monufia Governorate